"Vacation" is the debut single recorded by American-British-Canadian girl group G.R.L. The song was written by Bonnie McKee, Lukasz Gottwald, Max Martin, and Henry Walter with production handled by the latter three. "Vacation" is an upbeat breakup song.

Background and composition 

Following the disbandment of The Pussycat Dolls in 2010, Robin Antin suggested that the group would be "revamped" with new members. After different incarnations of the group Antin along the guidance of manager Larry Rudolph formed the group under a new name, G.R.L. with members: Lauren Bennett, Paula Van Oppen, Natasha Slayton, Simone Battle, and Emmalyn Estrada. Bennett was the first cast as a member for group with members being added gradually over the next year and a half. The group was officially unvelied at Chateau Marmont in April. On June 16, "Vacation" temporarily bundled and available for free as a B-side to Britney Spears' "Ooh La La for the soundtrack of The Smurfs 2. The song was available for digital download on June 18, 2013 and was sent to mainstream radio on September 3, 2013.

Reception 

Jason Lipshutz of Billboard magazine described the song "bubbly." While reviewing the Smurfs 2 soundtrack, Sherman Yang of XIN MSN Entertainment positively reviewed the song describing it as "fun and flirty." He also praised the song for having multiple vocalists and wrote "we can't wait to hear what else the girls have to offer in their upcoming debut album." Popdust's Jacques Peterson gave it a mixed review calling it "insipid and forgettable" to Spears' "Ooh La La".
In the United States as of July, the song has sold 2,000 copies, according to Nielsen SoundScan. Upon the release of "Ooh La La, "Vacation" debuted at number 97 on the South Korea Gaon International Chart.

Music video 
The music video for "Vacation" was directed by Hannah Lux Davis. Spice girls member, Mel B appeared at the end of the video.

Credits and personnel 
Personnel
Songwriting – Lukasz Gottwald, Max Martin, Bonnie McKee, Henry Walter
Production, instruments and programming – Dr. Luke, Max Martin, Cirkut
Engineering – Clint Gibbs, Sam Holland, Cory Bice (assistant), Rachael Findlen (assistant)
Mixing – Serban Ghenea

Credits adapted from the liner notes of Ooh La La, Kemosabe Kids/RCA Records.

Charts

Radio and release history

References 

2013 debut singles
2013 songs
G.R.L. songs
RCA Records singles
The Smurfs music
Music videos directed by Hannah Lux Davis
Song recordings produced by Dr. Luke
Song recordings produced by Max Martin
Song recordings produced by Cirkut (record producer)
Songs written by Cirkut (record producer)
Songs written by Bonnie McKee